A list of films produced in Italy in 1958 (see 1958 in film):

External links
Italian films of 1959=8 at the Internet Movie Database

1958
Films
Lists of 1958 films by country or language